Falsischnolea is a genus of beetles in the family Cerambycidae, containing the following species:

 Falsischnolea apicalis Martins & Galileo, 2001
 Falsischnolea flavoapicalis Breuning, 1940
 Falsischnolea nigrobasalis Breuning, 1940
 Falsischnolea pallidipennis (Chevrolat, 1861)

References

Apomecynini
Cerambycidae genera